Mirei may refer to any of the following:

Nonyma mirei, a beetle species
Rhabdotis mirei, a dung beetle
Mirei Kiritani, a Japanese actress
Mirei Sasaki, a Japanese idol and model
Mirei Shigemori, a modern Japanese landscape architect
Mirei Shikishima, a fictional character in Valkyrie Drive- Mermaid

Japanese unisex given names